Monika Czinano (born January 20, 2000) is an American college basketball player for the Iowa Hawkeyes of the Big Ten Conference. She plays the Power Forward / Center position. Czinano, who hails from Watertown, Minnesota, joined the Hawkeye women’s basketball program in 2018. As a freshman, she played behind former Hawkeye Megan Gustafson in the 2018–19 season, and took over the starting center position in 2019–20.

Czinano currently ranks third in NCAA Division I basketball with a 64.9% shooting touch from the field after ranking first and second nationally in shooting during her junior and sophomore seasons, respectively.

Monika Czinano scored 23 to lead Iowa as the 12th-ranked Hawkeyes took down No. 12 Indiana 74–67 to capture the Big Ten tournament championship on Sunday afternoon. The title marked the second for the Hawkeyes in the last four years.

Czinano finished last season leading the country in shooting percentage (66.8) and ranked second nationally in made baskets, draining 254-of-380 shots from the field.

High school 
As an eighth grader, Czinano got the call to come up to the varsity basketball team, something she was working her tail off for since she picked up a basketball. Even from a young age, Czinano knew what her goal in the game of basketball would be. After being called up to the varsity level, she suffered an ATV accident where she broke her femur and arm at the same time. A promising future in the game of basketball took a hit for Czinano before she even had the real chance of showing what she could do.

Along with dealing with the pains and challenges of rehab, Czinano had come to realize she would have to start all over and get back to basics to work her way back to the varsity team.

Flash forward to today, and you would never know Czinano's past struggles. Whether you see her on the court dominating inside the paint, or smiling and laughing with teammates, there's no doubt that she's thankful she got back on the court and proved to herself she could overcome the adversity that kept her from doing what she loves.

“I remember I went to The Barn a lot growing up to watch the Gophers play. I remember I had a birthday party there in third grade and I kind of realized that was a goal of mine, that I wanted to play in college…I remember walking by the locker room and just thinking how cool that was and how fun it would be to play there. It seemed kind of unattainable at that time, obviously, in third grade.”

Over the next five years, Monika would get better and better at basketball.

Her first offer came in 8th grade from North Dakota State out of the Summit League. As Czinano started her high school career at Watertown-Mayer, she began to realize that playing college basketball was more than just a dream. “Growing up, I didn’t really fully realize that college basketball was on the table until freshman year of high school…Beginning of my freshman year, getting my first offers and being like “wow ok, so I’m good enough to do this.

I went on a visit to Iowa and I remember calling my AAU director and being like “If Iowa offers, I’m committing. I love it. I want to go here.’” Lisa Bluder extended an offer to her early in her junior season at Watertown-Mayer and Monika says she committed on the spot.

“I’m really happy with the way my story went. I think Iowa is the perfect place for me. I think this is where I would have ended up regardless. It’s just such a homelike atmosphere.”
 Three-time all-conference honoree (2016, 2017, 2018)
 All-section selection by Breakdown Sports Media in 2017 and 2018
 First team All-State selection in 2018
 Team captain during her junior and senior years
 Scored 1,643 points and registered 1,035 rebounds during her high school career
 Averaged 23 points and 14 rebounds per game during her senior year
 Guided her team to back-to-back conference championships (2016, 2017)
 Played AAU for the Minnesota Fury
 Letter winner and state qualifier in track, swimming, and volleyball
 All-conference honoree in track and field
 National Honor Society, band, and theater member

College career

Freshman season 
So Czinano took every opportunity to learn from Gustafson. It meant getting her shots blocked, and Gustafson's shots consistently snapping the net over her, but failure was not only understood, it was looked at as an opportunity. The Iowa center, a freshman last season, was the one who had to go up against Megan Gustafson in practice every day.

“Monika has an amazing work ethic,” Bluder said. “She has an incredible attitude. She soaks up information like a sponge, and she loved playing behind Megan all year and learning from Megan, and I'm excited about Monika because she embraces contact, she doesn't back away from it.

Sophomore season 
As the Iowa Hawkeyes prepared for the championship game of the Big Ten Women’s Basketball Tournament against the Indiana Hoosiers, all eyes were on Big Ten Player of the Year Caitlin Clark. But Monika Czinano really stole the show. Czinano led her team with 30 points, 10 rebounds and two assists, consistently presenting a threat that the Hoosiers could not contain.

“As far as Czinano goes she is one of the best post players in the country for a reason,” said Indiana senior guard Grace Berger. “….She is so good at getting easy shots that she is so hard to stop.”

“Monika Czinano, I think showed why she’s one of the best posts in America,” said Hawkeye coach Lisa Bluder." From her footwork to her ability to use both hands, and how well she maneuvers in space and handles contact, the 6-foot-3 Czinano has so many of the qualities that you want in a post player. She also plays with high energy and with high emotion, and her teammates seem to feed off her presence.

 Czinano has earned first-team All-Big Ten honors in 2019-20
 Led the Big Ten in shooting percentage (67.9) and ranked second nationally, shooting 201 of 296
 Averaged 20.5 points during the Minnesota (Jan. 16) and Wisconsin (Jan. 19) games, making 18 of her 20 shots attempted to earn Big Ten Weekly Honor Roll
 Czinano is ranked first in the country in field goal percentage (70.1),

Junior season 
Iowa women's basketball junior center Monika Czinano leads Division I women's college basketball in field goal percentage at 70.1 percent. After a career performance against Northwestern on Jan. 28, the newly minted Big Ten Player of the Week dominated the paint to propel Iowa to a convincing win over Minnesota on Jan. 31, 94-68, earning the first Big Ten Player of the Week Award of her career Czinano has been scorching hot two games in a row for the Hawkeyes. In the Hawkeyes’ loss against Northwestern on Jan. 28, the 6-foot-3-inch center went 17-of-19 from the field for a career-high 34 points and 11 rebounds. It was her second double-double of the season. That night, Czinano made 15 consecutive shots, which is believed to be a Big Ten women's basketball single-game record. Czinano's recent success comes as no surprise to her teammates, who see her commanding performances in practice every day.

Iowa women's basketball coach Lisa Bluder stopped short of calling this Monika Czinano's team at Monday's media day. But it's still abundantly clear how important the junior center is to the Hawkeyes. Czinano was named a preseason all-Big Ten selection Wednesday by both the coaches and media. She was the only Iowa player on either list, further accentuating her veteran presence amid a fledgling group of Hawkeyes.

“I don't want to say this is her team. But certainly having a great inside attack like Monika opens up things for our three-point shooting. We still want to play the same style. We want to get up and down and run, and she does a great job with that in the inside position, but also we want to pass the ball really well. She's a wonderful target to pass the ball to. She's got great hands.”

 Czinano has earned first-team All-Big Ten honors in 2020-21
 Czinano was tops in the nation with a 66.8 field goal percentage
 Earned Preseason All-Big Ten honors from the coaches and media

Senior season 
Often overshadowed at Iowa, Monika Czinano is ‘the best big in the country. The Hawkeyes were leading and in control of their first-round NCAA Tournament matchup in front of a sold-out audience at Carver-Hawkeye Arena. But … Iowa wasn’t as efficient as it needed to be, either. With three minutes remaining in the first half, the Redbirds had cut the Hawkeyes’ lead to seven points and hit just enough 3-pointers to stay within range.

That's when Iowa altered its attack. Instead of launching 3-point attempts on trips up the floor, the Hawkeyes went inside to the nation's most reliable scorer. Center Monika Czinano, who has led Division I in field goal percentage the last two seasons (and was second as a sophomore), had taken just one shot at that point. But with three buckets in a five-possession sequence, Czinano helped double Iowa's lead to 14 points at halftime and eventually cruise to a 98–58 win Friday.

Iowa's Monika Czinano: Perfect from the field, perfect from the line in NCAA tournament win.

 Named an AP and WBCA All-American honorable mention
 Lisa Leslie Center of the Year Semifinalist
 Earned first team All-Big Ten accolades (coaches & media)
 Big Ten All-Tournament Team honoree
 Led the nation in field-goal percentage (67.9) and ranked sixth in field-goals made (277)
 Scored a season high in points (31) against Nebraska (Jan. 16) and against No. 10 Indiana (Feb. 21)
 Recorded season-high rebounds (16) at Northwestern (Jan. 29), averaging 6.2 rebounds per game
 Tied career-high five assists at Iowa State (Dec. 8)
 Recorded three season and her fourth career double-doubles with her last against Indiana in Big Ten Championship (March 6) — 30 points and 10 rebounds
 Academic All-Big Ten selection
 Dean's List honoree

"Super senior" season
With the NCAA having granted all basketball players active in the COVID-19-impacted 2020–21 season an extra year of athletic eligibility, Czinano chose to return to Iowa for a fifth season in 2022–23. She was selected to the Big Ten preseason all-conference team by both conference coaches and media, with the coaches' vote being unanimous.

Monika Czinano made a name for herself on the women's basketball team at the University of Iowa. Czinano has played an important role in the team's success, helping them to earn multiple victories in the Big Ten Conference.

In a game against Wisconsin during her senior season, Czinano demonstrated her talent and leadership on the court. Along with teammate Caitlin Clark, she led the No. 7 Hawkeyes to a decisive 30-point victory. Czinano was a dominant force in the game, scoring a game-high 23 points and pulling down 8 rebounds. Her performance showcased her versatility as a player, with her strong presence on the boards and her ability to score both inside and outside the paint.

Czinano's accomplishments in college basketball have not gone unnoticed. She has been recognized for her talent and hard work, earning honors such as the Big Ten Conference's Player of the Week award. Her success has also helped to raise the profile of women's basketball at the University of Iowa, inspiring other young women to pursue their own dreams in the sport.

In a game against the No. 8 ranked Maryland team during her super senior season, Czinano had a dominant performance, scoring a career-high 34 points on 16-of-21 shooting and grabbing 11 rebounds to help the No. 6 ranked Iowa Hawkeyes earn an impressive 93-67 victory.

Czinano's strong presence on the boards and ability to score both inside and outside the paint showcased her versatility as a player. Her impressive performance in this game earned her recognition in the Big Ten Conference and cemented her place as one of the top players in the league.

Monika Czinano has been recognized for her talent and hard work. During her super senior season at the University of Iowa, she was honored with All-Big Ten honors, recognizing her as one of the top players in the league.

Czinano's impressive performance on the court has been recognized by coaches and analysts alike, with some even predicting that the Iowa women's basketball team will be a top contender in the Big Ten Conference. Her skill and dedication have helped to raise the profile of women's basketball at the University of Iowa.

Monika Czinano has been recognized as one of the top players in the country. She was recently named to the John R. Wooden Award Women's Late Season Top 20, an honor reserved for the best college basketball players in the nation.

Monika Czinano, achieved a major milestone in her career during her senior season at the University of Iowa, becoming the fifth Hawkeye to surpass 2,000 career points and the 38th all-time in Big Ten Conference history. In addition to her impressive achievement, Czinano and her teammate Caitlin Clark made history as the first pair of teammates to surpass 2,000 career points in the same season in Big Ten women's basketball history.

College 

Source

Media

See also 
 List of NCAA Division I women's basketball career field-goal percentage leaders

References 

Iowa Hawkeyes women's basketball players
American women's basketball players
Basketball players from Minnesota
Centers (basketball)
Power forwards (basketball)
2000 births
Living people